Francisco de Abrego (died July 26, 1574) was a Roman Catholic prelate who served as Bishop of Panamá (1566–1574).

Biography
Francisco de Abrego was born in Spain and ordained a priest in the Order of Santiago. On February 15, 1566, Pope Pius V, appointed him Bishop of Panamá. He served as Bishop of Panamá until his death on July 26, 1574.

See also 
Catholic Church in Panama

References

External links and additional sources
 (for Chronology of Bishops) 
 (for Chronology of Bishops) 

1574 deaths
Bishops appointed by Pope Pius V
Roman Catholic bishops of Panamá